Saruwatari (written: 猿渡) is a Japanese surname. Notable people with the surname include:

, Japanese middle-distance runner
, Japanese manga artist

Fictional characters
, protagonist of the anime series Godannar
, a protagonist of the manga and anime series Moonlight Mile
, a character in the light novel series Hakata Tonkotsu Ramens

Japanese-language surnames